Jaime Itlman Reitich (25 July 1924 – 19 November 2005) was a Chilean sprinter. He competed in the men's 400 metres at the 1948 Summer Olympics.

References

External links
 

1924 births
2005 deaths
Athletes (track and field) at the 1948 Summer Olympics
Chilean male sprinters
Olympic athletes of Chile
Athletes (track and field) at the 1951 Pan American Games
Pan American Games medalists in athletics (track and field)
Pan American Games silver medalists for Chile
Medalists at the 1951 Pan American Games
20th-century Chilean people